Wade Skolney (born June 24, 1981) is a Canadian former professional ice hockey player. He played in one National Hockey League (NHL) game for the Philadelphia Flyers during the 2005–06 season.

Playing career
Skolney signed with the Flyers as an undrafted free agent on May 20, 2002 and spent four seasons with the AHL's Philadelphia Phantoms, winning the Calder Cup in the 2004–05 season. He played in only one game for the Flyers.

Skolney spent his final three professional seasons in Europe, playing for the Straubing Tigers of the Deutsche Eishockey Liga from 2007 to 2009 and Acroni Jesenice of the Austrian Erste Bank Eishockey Liga during the 2010–11 season.

See also
List of players who played only one game in the NHL

External links
 

1981 births
Living people
Brandon Wheat Kings players
Canadian ice hockey defencemen
Canadian people of Ukrainian descent
HK Acroni Jesenice players
Sportspeople from Humboldt, Saskatchewan
Philadelphia Flyers players
Philadelphia Phantoms players
Straubing Tigers players
Undrafted National Hockey League players
Wilkes-Barre/Scranton Penguins players
Ice hockey people from Saskatchewan
Canadian expatriate ice hockey players in Slovenia
Canadian expatriate ice hockey players in Germany